20/20 is the fourth album from West Coast hip hop group Dilated Peoples. Following the mixed reviews from their 2004 album Neighborhood Watch, the group was able to reclaim some of their past acclaim with 20/20, but not on the level of their first two efforts The Platform and Expansion Team. The album's lead single, "Back Again", was not able to make a strong impact, partly due to MTV refusing to play the video, due to a scene in which Rakaa wears a bulletproof vest. Back Again also appears in the EA Sports videogame Fight Night Round 3 And Sony Computer Entertainment videogame MLB 06: The Show.

Track listing

Album singles

Charts

References

2006 albums
Dilated Peoples albums
Capitol Records albums
Albums produced by the Alchemist (musician)
Albums produced by Evidence (musician)